Richard Paull Blennerhassett (1889–1957) was an Anglican priest in Australia the first two thirds of the Twentieth century.

Blennerhassett was educated at St Aidan's Theological College, Ballarat. He was ordained deacon in 1912, and priest in 1913. He served curacies at Inglewood and  Murtoa. He was Priest in charge at Lake Charm from 1914 to 1916. held incumbencies at Brown Hill, Rochester, Kyabram and Daylesford. In 1947 he became Vicar of St Mark, Golden Square. He was Archdeacon of Bendigo from  1949  to 1964.

References

1889 births
1957 deaths
20th-century Australian Anglican priests
Archdeacons of Bendigo
Alumni of St Aidan's Theological College, Ballarat